Fleesensee is a lake in the Mecklenburgische Seenplatte district in Mecklenburg-Vorpommern, Germany.

The lake is both fed and drained by the Elde river. On its shore, located in a part of the municipality Göhren-Lebbin, there is a large vacation resort that was opened in 2000.

References

External links 
 

Lakes of Mecklenburg-Western Pomerania
Federal waterways in Germany